Oxygen Games  was a developer and publisher of video gaming entertainment for major console platforms including the Nintendo DS, Wii, PlayStation 2 and PlayStation Portable, as well as for the PC. The company was incorporated in 2004 and is headquartered in Northamptonshire UK with North American operations based in Twain Harte, California.

Administration
On 12 October 2009 it was announced that Oxygen Games had gone into administration, appointing FA Simms & Partners Ltd as administrators. FA Simms & Partners said they would be “writing to creditors as soon as possible” to inform them of the situation.

Games by Oxygen Games
 8Ball Allstars (2008, Nintendo DS)
 Alan Hansen's Sports Challenge (2007, Wii/PC/PlayStation 2)
 C.I.D 925: An Ordinary Life (2009, Wii)
Cheggers' Party Quiz (2007, Wii/PC/PlayStation 2)
 King of Clubs (2007-2008, Nintendo DS/PC/PlayStation 2/Wii)
 PDC World Championship Darts 2008 (2008, Wii)
  (2005, PC Windows)
 Pirates: The Key of Dreams (2008, WiiWare)
 Pirates: Duels on the High Seas (2008, Nintendo DS)
 Powershot Pinball Constructor (2008, Nintendo DS)
 PDC World Championship Darts 2009 (2009, Wii/Nintendo DS)
My Friends (2008, Nintendo DS)

Games published by Oxygen Games
 Chronos Twin (2007, Nintendo DS)
 CID The Dummy (2008, Wii)
 Cate West: The Vanishing Files (2009, Wii and Nintendo DS)
Euro Rally Champion (2004, PS2)
 Robin Hood's Quest (2007, PC/PS2)
 Vietnam: The Tet Offensive (2005, PC/PS2)

See also
 List of Wii games
 List of Nintendo DS games
 List of PlayStation 2 games
 List of PlayStation Portable games

External links 
  Oxygen Games (official website)
 http://www.mcvuk.com/news/36089/Oxygen-Games-collapses

References

Video game companies established in 2004
Defunct video game companies of the United Kingdom